Super Best was the compilation album by the Japanese band The Blue Hearts. This retrospective is composed of their early efforts released by Meldac Records between 1987 and 1989. It also features two rarities that had not been issued on CD — "Blue Hearts Yori Ai o Komete", the song appeared on the video The Blue Hearts Live!, and "1985", the track taken from an independently produced soundsheet which was sold at their concert before they made a contract with the record label.

Super Best came out a month after the release of East West Side Story, another compilation which comprises materials after they moved to EastWest Japan. The record peaked at number-four on the Japanese Oricon chart upon its release, and it re-entered there after string of their songs were featured on the TV-drama Hito ni Yasashiku aired by Fuji Television in 2002. From that year onwards, the album have remained on the top-300 of the chart for over 200 weeks. Super Best was certified double platinum by the Recording Industry Association of Japan in November 2002, for shipments of over 800,000 copies.

Track listing

Charts

Chart positions

Year-end charts

Certifications

References

The Blue Hearts albums
1995 compilation albums